Thomas Buchecker Cooper (December 29, 1823 – April 4, 1862) was a Democratic member of the U.S. House of Representatives from Pennsylvania.

Thomas B. Cooper was born in Coopersburg, Pennsylvania.  He attended the public schools and Pennsylvania College at Gettysburg, Pennsylvania.  He graduated from the medical department of the University of Pennsylvania at Philadelphia in 1843 and commenced practice in Coopersburg.

Cooper was elected as a Democrat to the Thirty-seventh Congress and served until his death in Coopersburg in 1862.  Interment is in Woodland Cemetery.

See also
 List of United States Congress members who died in office (1790–1899)

Sources

 The Political Graveyard

External links
  – Grave in Woodlawn Cemetery, Pennsylvania
  – Cenotaph at the Congressional Cemetery, Washington, DC

1823 births
1862 deaths
People from Coopersburg, Pennsylvania
Physicians from Pennsylvania
Perelman School of Medicine at the University of Pennsylvania alumni
Democratic Party members of the United States House of Representatives from Pennsylvania
19th-century American politicians